The Northern California Rugby Football Union (NCRFU) is the Geographical Union (GU) for Adult rugby union teams in Northern California, as well as northern Nevada. The NCRFU is part of USA Rugby.

The NCRFU is traditionally one of the strongest unions in American rugby.  Cal Men's Rugby has won over twenty Collegiate Division I national championships, and NCRFU member clubs Stanford Women's Rugby, the Hayward Griffins, the Berkeley All Blues, the Reno Zephyrs, Mission RFC, UCSC Women's Rugby, and the now defunct Old Blue RFC have all won national championships in their respective divisions. SFGG RFC is a perennial Rugby Super League playoff team, winning the national championship in 2009.  The NCRFU also administers a large high school rugby division, from which Jesuit High School has won four national championships.

NCRFU select players are eligible to be selected for "Grizzly" Select Sides.

Men's Club Teams

Division I 
East Palo Alto Razorbacks RFC (East Palo Alto, CA)
Sacramento Lions RFC (Sacramento, CA)
San Francisco Golden Gate RFC (San Francisco, CA)
San Jose Seahawks (San Jose, CA)
Fresno RFC (Fresno, CA)
Santa Rosa Rugby Club (Santa Rosa, CA)

Division II 

Bay Area Baracus RFC (San Francisco, CA)
Berkeley RFC (Berkeley, CA)
Diablo Gaels RFC (Walnut Creek, CA)
Marin REDS Rugby Club (Marin City, CA)
Sacramento Capitals RFC (Sacramento, CA)
South Valley Bucks RFC (Morgan Hill, CA)
Vacaville RFC (Vacaville, CA)

Division III 
Aptos Beach Dog RFC (Aptos, CA)
Arroyo Grande RFC (Arroyo Grande, CA)
BA Chiefs RFC (San Francisco, CA)
Chico Mighty Oaks (Chico, CA)
Colusa County RFC (Colusa, CA)
Humboldt Old Growth RFC(Humboldt, CA)
Mendocino Steam Donkeys (Ukiah, CA)
Paso Robles RFC (Paso Robles, CA)
Redwood Empire RFC(Santa Rosa, CA)
Reno Zephyrs RFC (Reno, NV)
San Bruno Saints RFC (San Bruno, CA)
San Francisco Fog RFC (San Francisco, CA)
Shasta Highlanders RFC(Shasta, CA)
Sierra Foothills RFC (Penryn, CA)
Stanislaus RFC (Modesto, CA)
State of Jefferson RFC (Yreka, CA)
Vallejo Barbarians RFC(Vallejo, CA)
Washoe Wolves RFC (Reno, NV)

Women's Club Teams 
Berkeley All Blues (Berkeley, CA)
Sacramento Amazons (Sacramento, CA)
San Francisco Golden Gate (San Francisco, CA)
San Jose Seahawks Women's RFC (San Jose, CA)

Men's Collegiate Teams

Division I 
University of California, Santa Cruz
UCSB
Sacramento State University
Santa Clara University
Stanford University
St. Mary's College of California
University of California, Berkeley
University of California, Davis

Division II 
California Maritime Academy
Humboldt State University
San Francisco State University (Gators Rugby Football Club)
San Jose State University
Santa Rosa Junior College
Sierra College
University of San Francisco
California State University, Fresno
University of the Pacific, Stockton*University of Nevada, Reno
Sonoma State University

Women's Collegiate Teams

Division I 
Chico State University
Sacramento State University
Stanford University
University of California, Berkeley
University of California, Davis
University of Nevada, Reno

Division II 
Humboldt State University
Santa Clara University
St. Mary's College of California
University of California, Santa Cruz
San Jose State University

Boy's High School/Youth Teams

Bay Conference 
Alameda Islanders Under 19 RFC, Alameda, CA
Berkeley Rhinos
Bishop O'Dowd High School
Danville Oaks RFC
DeLaSalle High School
Delta Youth
Diablo Rugby Club
Hayward Rugby Club
Lamorinda Rugby Club
Los Gatos Youth Rugby
Marin Highlanders RFC
North Bay Rugby Club - The Wildcats
Oakland Military Institute
Oakland Warthogs
Piedmont International Touring Side
Pleasanton cavaliers
San Francisco Golden Gate
Santa Clara Youth Rugby

Redwood Empire Conference 
Elsie Allen High School (Santa Rosa, CA)
Montgomery
Rohnert Park Barbarians
Santa Rosa
Windsor
Fortuna

Sacramento Valley Teams
Center Parkway Harlequins
Christian Brothers RFC
CK McClatchy Rugby 
Cougar Rugby Club
Elk Grove United Rugby Club 
Granite Bay Rugby Club
Gridley Rugby
Jesuit High School Rugby Club
John F Kennedy High School Boys Rugby Club. 
Mother Lode RFC
Sacramento Eagles Rugby Club
SacPD PAL Rugby Club
Sierra Foothills Rugby Club
Solano-Yolo Rugby Club
Vacaville ([Vacaville])

Skyhawk Conference (South Bay) 
Bellarmine College Preparatory (San Jose, CA)
East Palo Alto Razorbacks (East Palo Alto, CA)
Live Oak High School (Morgan Hill, CA)
Peninsula Green Rugby (RWC, CA)
Silicon Valley Durabos
San Mateo Warriors U19(San Mateo, CA)

Girl's High School/Youth Teams 
Dixon High School, Dixon, CA
Alameda Riptide Under 19, Alameda, CA
American Youth Rugby Union, Mountain View, CA
Berkeley Red Hawks (formerly Golden Star), Berkeley, CA
Danville Oaks RFC
Davis High School
Bishop O'Dowd High School
Fortuna High School
Mother Lode RFC
Sacramento Amazons u19
Santa Rosa RFC
Santa Clara Youth Rugby, Santa Clara County Youth Rugby, CA

See also
USA Rugby
Rugby union in the United States

References

External links
NCRFU Home Page
NCRFU Referee Society Webpage
USA Rugby Official Site
IRB Official Site

Rugby union governing bodies in the United States
Rugby union in California
2013 establishments in the United States
Sports organizations established in 2013
Sports in Nevada